is a role-playing video game for the PlayStation Vita system. It is based on the universe of the MMORPG Ragnarok Online, containing many elements of Norse mythology. It was released in February 2012 within Japan, August 21, 2012 in South Korea, October 30, 2012 in North America and February 20, 2013 in Europe. An updated version titled Ragnarok Odyssey Ace has been released on PlayStation Vita and PlayStation 3.

Gameplay
Ragnarok Odyssey is a real-time action RPG in similar vein to the series Monster Hunter. The game retains many elements typical of RPGs, such as health and magic, item collecting/crafting, interaction with NPCs and a class system but no leveling system. Missions in Odyssey are received at guild halls and usually consist of collecting items or killing enemies.

There are six interchangeable classes players may pick from; the Sword Warrior, Hammersmith, Mage, Assassin, Hunter and Cleric with their own individual advantages and weaknesses. Instead of a typical leveling system, Odyssey uses a Card System. Cards can be equipped to a character's clothing/armor to provide statistic boosts and class-specific abilities. Upgraded clothing/armor can have an increased Card Capacity and hence can equip higher cost/additional cards. Cards are found in shops or dropped by defeated enemies.

Ragnarok Odyssey Ace
Ragnarok Odyssey Ace is an updated version of Ragnarok Odyssey developed for the PlayStation Vita and PlayStation 3. This new version of the game contains all the DLC from the original game, as well as new enemies, skills, dungeons HUD, gameplay balance adjustment and an extra episode after the ending. The first print copies of the game included various in-game bonus. It is also possible to import save data from the original game for use in Ragnarok Odyssey Ace.

The PlayStation Vita version was released on August 29, 2013 in Japan. Composer Nobuo Uematsu contributed one new song for Ragnarok Odyssey Ace.

Reception

Odyssey has received mixed reviews from critics. On Metacritic, the game has an average score of 66 out of 100. The most positive of reviews came from Destructoid Jim Sterling who gave the game a 9/10. Sterling praised the game's visuals, calling it the best looking Vita game to date, fast loading screens, customization, tight controls and subtle use of the touchscreen. Odyssey was given a 32/40 score in Famitsu.

, Ragnarok Odyssey has sold over 100,000 copies in Japan. Ragnarok Odyssey Ace sold 31,622 physical retail copies within the first week of release in Japan.

Notes

References

External links
Official North American website
Official Japanese website

2012 video games
Multiplayer and single-player video games
PlayStation 3 games
PlayStation Vita games
Ragnarok Online
Video games based on Norse mythology
Video games developed in Japan
Video games featuring protagonists of selectable gender
Video games scored by Kumi Tanioka
Video games with cross-platform play
Role-playing video games
Multiplayer online games
Sony Interactive Entertainment games
Game Arts games